Li Shang (died 180 BC) was a Chinese military general and politician of the early Western Han dynasty. He was the brother of Li Yiji, an advisor to Liu Bang, the founding emperor of the Han dynasty. He was enfeoffed at Quzhou and awarded the noble title "Marquis of Quzhou" (曲周侯). Li Shang is generally revered as the founding ancestor of the Li (郦) surname.

References

180 BC deaths
Year of birth unknown
Chu–Han contention people
Han dynasty generals from Henan
Han dynasty politicians from Henan